Netumbo Nandi-Ndaitwah (born 29 October 1952) is a Namibian politician who is the Deputy Prime Minister of Namibia since March 2015. Netumbo Nandi-Ndaitwa, the current SWAPO vice president, has retained her position, and she is set to become the party's first female presidential candidate in November 2024. She has also been serving as Namibia's Minister of International Relations and Cooperation since December 2012. From March 2010 to December 2012, she was Minister of Environment and Tourism.  Nandi-Ndaitwah is a member of SWAPO, Namibia's ruling party, and a long-time member of the National Assembly. In 2017, Nandi-Ndaitwah was elected vice-president of the Swapo Party at the party's 6th Congress. She is the first woman to serve in that position.

Early life and education

Ndemupelila Netumbo Nandi-Ndaitwah was born on 29 October 1952 to Justina Nekoto Shaduka-Nandi and Petrus Nandi at Onamutai in northern Namibia. Ndaitwah was educated at St. Mary's Mission in Odibo.

Nandi-Ndaitwah went into exile in 1974 and joined SWAPO members in Zambia. She worked at the SWAPO headquarters in Lusaka, Zambia from 1974 to 1975 and attended a course at the Lenin Higher Komsomol School in the Soviet Union from 1975 to 1976. She graduated with a diploma in work and practice of communist youth movement. In 1987 she obtained a post-graduate diploma in public administration and management from the Glasgow College of Technology, UK, and in 1988 a further post-graduate diploma, in international relations, from Keele University, UK. In 1989 Nandi-Ndaitwah obtained a master's degree in diplomatic studies, also from Keele University.

Political career

Nandi-Ndaitwah became the SWAPO deputy representative in Zambia from 1976 until 1978 and the chief representative in Zambia from 1978 to 1980. From 1980 until 1986, she was the SWAPO chief representative in East Africa, based at Dar es Salaam. She was a member of the SWAPO central committee from 1976 to 1986 and president of the Namibian National Women's Organisation (NANAWO) from 1991 to 1994.

She has been a member of the National Assembly of Namibia since 1990. She was deputy Minister of International Relations and Cooperation from 1990 to 1996 and first gained ministerial status in 1996 as director-general of Women Affairs in the Office of the President, where she served until 2000. In 2000 she was promoted to minister, and given the Women Affairs and Child Welfare portfolio.

From 2005 to 2010, she was the Minister of Information and Broadcasting in Namibia's cabinet. She subsequently served as Minister of Environment and Tourism until a major cabinet reshuffle in December 2012, in which she was appointed Minister of Minister of Foreign Affairs, a portfolio since renamed to International Relations and Cooperation.

Under President Hage Geingob, Nandi-Ndaitwah was appointed as Deputy Prime Minister of Namibia in March 2015, while serving in parallel as Minister of International Relations and Cooperation. Nandi-Ndaitwah sits both on SWAPO's central committee and the politburo. She also is the party's secretary for information and mobilisation and as such, is one of SWAPO's main spokespeople.

In March 2023, President Hage Geingob named Netumbo Nandi-Ndaitwah as the sole candidate for the ruling Swapo party in next year's elections.

Personal life
Netumbo Nandi-Ndaitwah is married to Epaphras Denga Ndaitwah, former Chief of the Namibian Defence Force.

Interests 
Netumbo Nandi-Ndaitwa interests lies in children and community work and reading.

See also
List of current foreign ministers

References

1952 births
Living people
Members of the National Assembly (Namibia)
People from Oshana Region
SWAPO politicians
Alumni of Keele University
20th-century Namibian women politicians
20th-century Namibian politicians
21st-century Namibian women politicians
21st-century Namibian politicians
Deputy Prime Ministers of Namibia
Foreign ministers of Namibia
Female foreign ministers
Women government ministers of Namibia
Environment and tourism ministers of Namibia
Information ministers of Namibia
Gender equality and social welfare ministers of Namibia
Women members of the National Assembly (Namibia)